HMS Hunter was a H-class destroyer built for the Royal Navy in the mid-1930s. During the Spanish Civil War of 1936–1939 the ship enforced the arms blockade imposed on both sides by Britain and France, until she struck a mine in May 1937. She was under repair for the next year and a half, after which she rejoined the Mediterranean Fleet. During the first few months of the Second World War, Hunter searched for German commerce raiders in the Atlantic Ocean until she was transferred back to Britain in February 1940. Returning to action in the Norwegian Campaign, she was sunk by German destroyers during the First Battle of Narvik in April 1940.

Description
Steam for the turbines was provided by three Admiralty 3-drum water-tube boilers. The ship's complement was 137 officers and men in peacetime, but this was increased to 146 in wartime.

The ship mounted four 45-calibre 4.7-inch (120 mm) Mark IX guns in single mounts. For anti-aircraft (AA) defence, Hunter had two quadruple Mark I mounts for the 0.5 inch Vickers Mark III machine gun. She was fitted with two above-water quadruple torpedo tube mounts for  torpedoes. One depth charge rail and two throwers were fitted; 20 depth charges were originally carried, but this increased to 35 shortly after the war began.

Career
Ordered on 13 December 1934, Hunter was laid down by Swan Hunter & Wigham Richardson at Wallsend-on-Tyne, England, on 27 March 1935. She was launched on 25 February 1936 and completed on 30 September. Excluding government-furnished equipment such as armament, the ship cost £253,167. Hunter was assigned to the 2nd Destroyer Flotilla of the Mediterranean Fleet upon commissioning.

The destroyer patrolled Spanish waters during the Spanish Civil War, enforcing the edicts of the Non-Intervention Committee. Hunter struck a mine south of Almeria, Spain, on the afternoon of 13 May 1937. She suffered severe damage, with a heavy list, her radio wrecked and the bow flooded. Eight of her complement were killed and 24 wounded. The ship was towed clear of the minefield by the Spanish Republican destroyer . The mines had been laid by two ex-German Spanish Nationalist E-boats, the Requeté and the Falange on the night of 6 April. The light cruiser  towed her to Gibraltar, where she was temporarily repaired from 15 May to 18 August. Hunter was towed to Malta for permanent repairs in August 1937, but they were not completed until 10 November 1938. The ship was assigned to the 2nd Destroyer Flotilla once her repairs were finished and she was given a brief overhaul in Malta between 24 June and 4 July 1939. Hunter was sent to Plymouth for a more thorough refit in mid-August 1939 that lasted through 27 August.

Second World War

When the Second World War began on 3 September, Hunter was en route to Freetown, Sierra Leone to search for German commerce raiders, before being transferred to the North America and West Indies Station in late October. Hunter remained on that station until she was transferred to the British Isles in February 1940 and began a refit at Falmouth that lasted until 9 March. The ship rejoined the 2nd Destroyer Flotilla of the Home Fleet at Scapa Flow on 17 March. On 6 April Hunter and the rest of the 2nd Destroyer Flotilla escorted the four destroyer minelayers of the 20th Destroyer Flotilla as they sailed to implement Operation Wilfred, an operation to lay mines in the Vestfjord to prevent the transport of Swedish iron ore from Narvik to Germany. The mines were laid on the early morning of 8 April, before the Germans began their invasion, and the destroyers joined the battlecruiser  and her escorts.

During the First Battle of Narvik on 10 April 1940, Hunter and four other H-class ships of the 2nd Destroyer Flotilla attacked the German destroyers that had transported German troops to occupy Narvik in northern Norway the previous day. As the British ships were withdrawing, they encountered five German destroyers at close range. Two of the German ships crossed the T of the British ships and quickly set Hardy on fire and forced her to run aground. Hunter eventually took the lead, but was severely damaged by the Germans, probably including one torpedo hit, and her speed dropped rapidly. Hotspur, immediately behind her, was temporarily out of control due to two hits, and rammed her from behind. When the ships managed to disengage, Hunter capsized. 107 men of the crew were killed and another five died of their wounds. The German destroyers rescued 46 men, who were released into Sweden on 13 April.

Rediscovery

The wreck was discovered on 5 March 2008 by the Royal Norwegian Navy mine control vessel , after being unknown for nearly 70 years, and will be marked as a war grave to commemorate the lost members of her crew. A series of coordinated memorial ceremonies were held on board British and Norwegian warships on Saturday 8 March 2008, honouring all those who died during the battles of Narvik. Over a thousand NATO personnel took part, including British and Norwegian sailors, Royal Marines and soldiers. Hunters final resting place was marked with wreaths cast into the sea.

Notes

Footnotes

References

External links

YouTube video of Memorial service"
BBC News: "HMS Hunter: A survivor remembers"
BDNews: "British World War Two ship found in Norwegian fjord"
IWM Interview with survivor Samuel Evens
IWM Interview with survivor Marshal Soult

 

G and H-class destroyers of the Royal Navy
Ships built by Swan Hunter
Ships built on the River Tyne
1935 ships
World War II destroyers of the United Kingdom
World War II shipwrecks in the Norwegian Sea
Maritime incidents in 1937
Maritime incidents in Spain
Maritime incidents in April 1940
Maritime incidents in Norway
Mediterranean naval operations of the Spanish Civil War